Proschoenobius  is a genus of moths of the family Crambidae.

Species
Proschoenobius forsteri Munroe, 1974
Proschoenobius subcervinellus (Walker, 1863)

References

Natural History Museum Lepidoptera genus database

Schoenobiinae
Crambidae genera
Taxa named by Eugene G. Munroe